The White Monk (Spanish:El monje blanco) is a 1945 Mexican historical drama film directed by Julio Bracho and starring María Félix, Tomás Perrín and Julio Villarreal. The film's sets were designed by the art director Jorge Fernandez.

It is set in Italy in the thirteenth century.

Cast
 María Félix as Gálata Orsina 
 Tomás Perrín as Conde Hugo del Saso / Fray Paracleto 
 Julio Villarreal as Sacerdote  
 Paco Fuentes as Capolupo  
 Consuelo Guerrero de Luna as Condesa Próspera Huberta  
 María Douglas as Mina Amanda  
 José Pidal as Fray Matías  
 Manuel Noriega
 Fanny Schiller 
 Felipe Montoya as Marco Leone  
 Ángel T. Sala as Montero 
 José Elías Moreno 
 Ernesto Alonso as Fray Can  
 Marta Elba as Anabella 
 Alejandro Cobo as Bertone  
 Manolo Fábregas as Piero 
 María Gentil Arcos as Peregrina  
 Paco Martinez as Peregrino

References

Bibliography 
 Paco Ignacio Taibo. María Félix: 47 pasos por el cine. Bruguera, 2008.

External links 
 

1945 films
1940s historical drama films
Mexican historical drama films
1940s Spanish-language films
Films directed by Julio Bracho
Films set in the 13th century
Films set in Italy
Mexican black-and-white films
1945 drama films
1940s Mexican films